Samantha Elizabeth Faiers (born 31 December 1990) is an English television personality and model. She is known for having starred in the ITV2 reality series The Only Way Is Essex from 2010 to 2014. In 2014, she competed in the thirteenth series of Celebrity Big Brother, finishing in fifth place.

Career
On 10 October 2010, Faiers appeared in the first episode of The Only Way Is Essex and in total, starred in eleven series of the show. The second series of the programme saw Faiers' sister Billie join the cast. During this series, Faiers also began a relationship with cast member Joey Essex. However, their relationship came to an end again months later in the ninth series. In March 2014, Faiers announced that she would be taking a break from The Only Way Is Essex after the end of its eleventh series, due to her recent Crohn's disease diagnosis and to work on her relationship with Essex.

In January 2014, Faiers entered the Celebrity Big Brother house to compete in the thirteenth series. She entered handcuffed to fellow housemate, American starlet Jasmine Waltz, as part of a task. It was revealed that Faiers had been meeting a journalist from OK! during her stay in the house, so that she could continue writing her weekly column for the magazine. Faiers made the final on Day 27 but finished in fifth place. While in the house, Faiers was unwell and stated that she 'couldn't keep food down', and was later diagnosed with Crohn's disease. In 2016, Faiers began starring in her own reality series on ITVBe, titled Sam Faiers: The Baby Diaries. Sister Billie was later added to the main cast, and the programme was retooled into Sam and Billie Faiers: The Mummy Diaries.

Other ventures
Faiers has made guest appearances on chat shows such as Loose Women, This Morning and Daybreak. She was a panellist on the fifth episode of series 8 of Shooting Stars and starred on the eleventh series of The Real Hustle, going undercover as a bitter ex-wife to help the Hustlers con a mark. She has also been a panellist on Celebrity Juice twice, once during the sixth series and again in the ninth series with her (then) fiancé Joey Essex. Faiers has recently launched her own online fitness website (Celebrity Training with Sam Faiers) which offers only workout videos and healthy eating recipes.

Personal life
Faiers was engaged to fellow TOWIE cast member Joey Essex, but later split up. They reconciled later in 2012. Essex then proposed to Faiers again in March 2013 and Faiers accepted. However, the couple split up again on-screen in June 2013 following several arguments between the pair. In October 2014 they announced they had split up "for good".

In February 2014, Faiers was diagnosed with Crohn's disease. It is believed that she first displayed symptoms during her time in the Celebrity Big Brother house. During her stay in the house she was admitted to hospital twice for tests, which continued into February once she had left the house, finally achieving a diagnosis.

On 21 August 2015, Faiers announced she is expecting her first child with partner Paul. On 29 December 2015, Faiers gave birth to a boy, Paul Tony Knightley. On 5 July 2017, Faiers announced she is expecting her second child. On 11 November 2017, Faiers gave birth to a girl, Rosie Knightley. On 23 November 2021, Faiers announced she is expecting her third child. On 10 May 2022, Faiers gave birth to a boy, Edward Knightley.

Filmography

As actress

See also
 List of people diagnosed with Crohn's disease
 List of The Only Way Is Essex cast members

References

External links
 

1990 births
English television personalities
Living people
People from Brentwood, Essex
Television personalities from Essex
People with Crohn's disease